Earias insulana, the Egyptian stemborer, Egyptian bollworm, spiny bollworm or cotton spotted bollworm,  is a moth of the family Nolidae. The species was first described by Jean Baptiste Boisduval in 1833. It is found in most of Africa, southern Europe, the Near East and Middle East, Japan, Taiwan, the Philippines, Australia and Hawaii. It is a rare in immigrant in Great Britain.

The wingspan is 20–22 mm. Adults show strong seasonal polymorphism, depending on the temperature. Two distinct forms are present in some areas: a bright green summer form and a brownish-yellow autumn form.

The larvae feed on okra, cotton and hibiscus, but have also been recorded on rice, sugarcane and corn. Initially, the larva tunnels into the buds of their host plant. Later, the larva feeds on the bolls, which become brown and fall off. Secondary invasion by fungi and bacteria sometimes occurs. Full-grown larvae are 13–18 mm long and their wingspan is generally about 24–28 mm. It can be confused with the cream-bordered green pea (Earias clorana) or the spiny bollworm (Earias biplaga).

Pupation takes place in a felt-like cocoon, which is attached to dry leaves of the food plant or to plant debris on the ground. Typically, the pupal stage takes 9–15 days, but may extend to up to two months if development is delayed by low temperatures.

References

External links

Lepiforum e.V.

Nolidae
Moths described in 1833
Moths of Europe
Moths of Cape Verde
Moths of Africa
Moths of the Comoros
Moths of Japan
Moths of Madagascar
Moths of Mauritius
Moths of the Middle East
Moths of Réunion
Moths of Asia
Taxa named by Jean Baptiste Boisduval